Gintaras Ramonas (6 November 1962 – 11 November 1997) was a Lithuanian politician. In 1990 he was among those who signed the Act of the Re-Establishment of the State of Lithuania.

References

1962 births
1997 deaths
Liberal and Centre Union politicians